Gostingen may refer to:

 Gostingen, Luxembourg
 Gostyń, Poland